Svedala Municipality (Svedala kommun) is a municipality in Skåne County in southern Sweden, just southeast of Malmö. Its seat is located in the town of Svedala.

The present municipality is the result of a series of  amalgamations, carried out in 1952, 1967, 1974 and 1977. Svedala was last municipality to be completed during the local government reform of the 1970s. There had been considerations of adding the whole or parts of the territory to Malmö Municipality.

There exists a city partnership between Svedala Municipality and Bergen auf Rügen, Germany.

Localities
There are 5 urban areas (also called a Tätort or locality) in Svedala Municipality.

In the table the urban areas are listed according to the size of the population as of 2010. The municipal seat is in bold characters.

Elections
Below are the results listed from since the 1973 municipal reform. Between 1988 and 1998 the Sweden Democrats' results were not published by the SCB due to the party's small size nationwide. "Turnout" denotes the percentage of the electorate casting a ballot, but "Votes" only applies to valid ballots cast.

Riksdag

Blocs

This lists the relative strength of the socialist and centre-right blocs since 1973, but parties not elected to the Riksdag are inserted as "other", including the Sweden Democrats results from 1988 to 2006, but also the Christian Democrats pre-1991 and the Greens in 1982, 1985 and 1991. The sources are identical to the table above. The coalition or government mandate marked in bold formed the government after the election. New Democracy got elected in 1991 but are still listed as "other" due to the short lifespan of the party. "Elected" is the total number of percentage points from the municipality that went to parties who were elected to the Riksdag.

Riksdag

Culture 
The event SommarRock (Summer Rock) is held every year in Svedala the second week in July. In 2011 the event attracted 12.200 visitors. Popular bands are The Ark, Mustasch, September and Wilmer X. 2012 marks its 25th anniversary, since its start in 1987.

In Bara there is a PGA Golf Course that opened 2009. It is ranked as the 17th best PGA Golf Course in Europe.

In Svedala there is also a local newspaper called Lokaltidningen Svedala.

References
Statistics Sweden

External links

Svedala - Official site
Coat of arms

Municipalities of Skåne County
Municipalities in the Øresund Region